Fall Out Boy or Fallout Boy may refer to:
Fall Out Boy, a band from Illinois, United States
Fallout Boy (The Simpsons), a fictional character from The Simpsons and Bongo Comics
 Vault-Tec's mascot, properly called "Vault Boy", from the Fallout media franchise

See also
Fall guy